Philippe Mius d’Entremont, 1st Baron of Pobomcoup (1609–1701) was an early settler of Acadia, and progenitor of the Muise and d’Entremont families of Nova Scotia.

Biography
Philippe Mius d’Entremont was born in Normandy, France, and he was expelled out of France because of who his daughter married and was sent to Acadia with his family in 1651 as a lieutenant-major with Charles de Saint-Étienne de la Tour, who had been named Governor of Acadia by Louis XIII of France first in 1631, and again by Louis XIV in 1651. The governor in July 1653 awarded him one of the few fiefs to constitute territory in North America, the first in Acadia, and the second in all Canada, the Barony of Pobomcoup. Pobomcoup, meaning in Mi'kmaq "land from which the trees have been removed to fit it for cultivation", extended from Cap-Nègre (Clyde River) to Cap-Fourchu (Yarmouth). He promoted agriculture on his seigneury and brought to his estate several indentured workers and a few families from Port-Royal. The settlement and Mius d'Entremont's residence were established at Pubnico, the modern spelling of Pobomcoup. Pubnico is considered the oldest village in Nova Scotia still occupied by the Acadians, and also the oldest village in Canada still occupied by the descendants of its founder.

In 1654, d'Entremont was captured by Major General Robert Sedgwick when he added Acadia to the British dominions after capturing the forts of Saint John, Port Royal, and the settlement of Penobscot. He did not resurface with his family until the colony was restored to France in 1670. At this time he was created a procureur du roi (King's attorney) in Acadia by Governor Hector d'Andigné de Grandfontaine, a post he retained until 1687. At an advanced age, he left his seigneurial estate, bequeathing the title of baron to his eldest son Jacques, and resided with his eldest daughter until he died in 1701.

The barony of Pobomcoup remained in the family until the expulsion of the Acadians that began in 1755 by the British.

Family
Philippe is the maternal grandson of Gaspard II de Coligny, Admiral of France (1519-1572). Coligny was a very influential player for the Huguenot side during the French Wars of Religion. Coligny's legacy has amassed several intricate portraits, a statue carved outside the Louvre, and his having five cities across four separate continents (Asia, Antarctica notwithstanding) bearing his name as tribute for his colonial efforts in the name of French Protestants. On his maternal side, Coligny descends from the Montmorency house. During the 16th century, the three most powerful houses of France were the Montmorencys, the Catholic Guise faction, and the Bourbon house. In Central France alone the Montmorencys owned 600 fiefs. On Coligny's paternal side his family were servants for King Louis XI dating back to the 11th century. Coligny's German interpreter was Nicolas Muss, Philippe's maternal grandfather. Both Nicolas and Coligny were gruesomely murdered by Catholics during the St. Bartholomew's Day Massacre (1572), organised by the Queen Mother Catherine de' Medici who detested Coligny and Nicolas' influence over her weak son Charles IX. All of Coligny's attendants fled the scene except Nicolas, who was promptly murdered in the foyer by Catholic invaders. Nicolas' son and Philippe's father Claude Antoine Mius, Baron de Meuillon, was thus adopted by Coligny's second wife Jacquelin Montbel d'Entremont, sole heiress of the d'Entremont name. Claude married Jacquelin's daughter Beatrix de Coligny, and Jacquelin had her wish granted to continue her family name by adding d'Entremont to Claude's son Philippe Mius d'Entremont, born 1609. Philippe married Madeleine Hélie in Normandy and had the following children:

Children
 Marguerite Mius d'Entremont (1649–1714), married Pierre Melanson, founder of Grand-Pré
 Jacques Mius d'Entremont, 2nd Baron of Pobomcoup (1654–1736), married Anne de Saint-Étienne de la Tour, daughter of Charles de Saint-Étienne de la Tour
 Abraham Mius d'Entremont (1658–1702), married Marguerite de Saint-Étienne de la Tour, sister of Anne de Saint-Étienne de la Tour
 Philippe Mius d'Azy (1660- ), married a Mi'kmaq woman and became the progenitor of the Meuse and Muise families
 Madeleine Mius d'Entremont (1669- )

See also
 Port-Royal (Acadia)
 Canadian Hereditary Peers

External links
 Sieur Philippe Mius d'Entremont, Baron of Pobomcoup At Musée Acadien
 Statue of Baron Philippe Mius d'Entremont
 Philippe Mius d'Entremont – Founder of Pubnico

References

People from Yarmouth County
Acadian people
Year of birth uncertain
1701 deaths
1609 births